The 1954 24 Hours of Le Mans was a 22nd race for Sports Cars, and took place on 12 and 13 June 1954, at the Circuit de la Sarthe, Le Mans, France. It was also the fourth race of the 1954 World Sportscar Championship. The race was won by José Froilán González and Maurice Trintignant driving a Ferrari 375 Plus.

People viewed this race as a battle between brute force and science (per the July 1954 "Motor Sport" article). In the high technology corner, with its sleek, aerodynamic bodywork was the new 3.4-litre Jaguar D-Type, and in the other corner was Ferrari's formidable 5.0-litre V12 375 Plus. Ranged in between was everyone else. The race was heavily affected by poor weather throughout and was a thriller right to the end, producing the closest finish for the race since 1933: less than 5km (half a lap).

Regulations
The ACO again extended the replenishment window (last updated in 1952) of fuel, oil and water from 28 to 30 laps (405 km) although brake fluid was now exempted from this restriction for safety reasons. The equivalence multiplier for forced-induction engines (i.e. supercharged) was reduced from x2.0 to x1.4.

On the track, the stretch from the corners at Mulsanne to Arnage was widened to 8 metres (finishing the work starting in 1950) and the Indianapolis corner was given a slightly banked camber.

Also, this was the first year the race would be televised, getting it a far bigger potential audience.

Entries
After the previous year's intense interest from manufacturers for the new Championship, this year the variety of works teams was reduced: Mercedes had decided to stay focused on F1, Alfa Romeo had closed its racing division, Lancia scratched their team (supposedly daunted by the speed of the Jaguars) and Austin-Healey boycotted the event because of the ongoing presence of the sports-car prototypes. But there were still 85 cars registered for this event, of which a full field of 58 arrived for practice as the remaining manufacturers increased their presence.

As before, Jaguar's sole racing focus for the year was Le Mans and after their 1953 success, they arrived with three of the fantastic new Jaguar D-Type - purpose-built for the smooth tarmac of La Sarthe. A beautiful design, it had been tested in a wind-tunnel and featured the now-famous vertical fin to provide high-speed stability. Low (only ) and sleek, it was extremely fast: the 3.4-litre straight-6 engine was redesigned and tilted at 8 degrees (to reduce height, like the Mercedes-Benz 300 SL had done) and developed 250 bhp with a top speed over 270 km/h. The cars were so new that they had not even been painted when they got to Le Mans. The driver line-up was kept pretty much the same from 1953 with winners Tony Rolt / Duncan Hamilton, and 2nd place Stirling Moss / Peter Walker. This year Peter Whitehead was paired with F1 driver Ken Wharton (his former co-driver Ian Stewart was racing with his brother, Graham, at Aston Martin). An ex-works C-Type was provided for the Belgian Ecurie Francorchamps team when their original car was crashed on the way to the circuit by a Jaguar mechanic.

The major Italian works teams, Scuderia Ferrari, Officine Alfieri Maserati and Automobili Osca all brought new cars for this race: Ferrari's answer to the D-type was the new Ferrari 375 Plus: styled by Pinin Farina, it had a bored-out version of the Lampredi-designed V12 engine, now up to 4,954cc and putting out some 345 bhp, (nearly 40% more than the Jaguars) and a top speed approaching 270 km/h. Not as fast as the Jaguar, but its excellent acceleration was a suitable equaliser on a power-circuit such as Le Mans, with its long straights. With three of his best drivers now unavailable – Alberto Ascari was with Lancia, Giuseppe Farina had been injured in the Mille Miglia and Mike Hawthorn's father had just died suddenly – Ferrari could still field a top team of drivers: three of them - Umberto Maglioli, José Froilán González and Maurice Trintignant were in the current Ferrari F1 works team. With them were Paolo Marzotto (the only works finisher in the 1953 race), ex-Gordini driver Robert Manzon (like Trintignant) and Louis Rosier, 1952 race winner with Talbot. 
They were backed up three other Ferraris entered by Briggs Cunningham's and Luigi Chinetti's American teams. Glamour came with Chinetti's team with film star Zsa Zsa Gabor accompanying her rich playboy-boyfriend, Dominican Porfirio Rubirosa.

Maserati was taking over the Formula 1 world in 1954 with its outstanding 250F. They had also developed an uprated version of their A6GCS sportscar, replacing the 2.0-litre engine with the 2.5L version from the 250F. A standard 2.0-litre version was also privately entered, with factory support, for the Marquis de Portago. OSCA had started the year sensationally when a 1500cc MT-4 entered by Cunningham and driven by Stirling Moss and Bill Lloyd won the Sebring 12-hours against far more powerful opposition. Three such cars arrived at Le Mans.

Always looking to be competitive, as well as running the Ferrari 375 MM (because Ferrari had refused to sell him an engine for his own cars), Cunningham had tried to secure the new Dunlop disc brakes for his cars. However Jaguar used its contract-right to veto the deal. He arrived with a pair of the older Cunningham C-4R roadsters for his regular driver complement– the sole entrants in the Over-5 litre class.

It was a big entry for Lagonda-Aston Martin with five works cars and two private entries. One of the two DB3S spyders had a supercharged 2.9L engine that developed 235 bhp driven by British F1 drivers Reg Parnell and Roy Salvadori, the other was run by Carroll Shelby. Alongside them were a pair of aerodynamic coupés & the long-running, expensive Lagonda sports car with a 4.5L V12 (effectively a double-Aston Martin engine)
Gordini arrived with four cars, competing in three classes. The lead car, a T24S driven by Behra and Simon, had a 3.0L engine developing 230 bhp and new Messier disc brakes was capable of over 230 km/h. Gordini also entered a pair of older T15S, also with disc-brakes but with 2.5L and 2.0L engines respectively. Talbot sent no works team this year but supplied an improved 4.5L engine (now capable of 280 bhp) for the T26 spyders of the three private entries (Levegh, Meyrat, Grignard).

In the S-2000 class Bristol returned with three coupés developed from the previous year's model, with better styling and improved aerodynamics. There were also three Frazer-Nashes, using the same Bristol engine, as well as the first entries in the race for Triumph (an off-the shop-floor TR2) and Maserati.

Porsche returned with three cars to contest the S-1500 category against the OSCAs. The Porsche 550s were given a new quad-cam engine making 110 bhp and 210 km/h, and this year were open-top spyders. Another was also given a smaller 1089cc engine for the S-1100 class.
The small British sportscar firm Kieft arrived with two cars to take on the smallest Porsche – bringing the first fibreclass chassis to Le Mans. One was also the first car with the new Coventry Climax FWA engine.

The small-engine classes were well-represented, and again dominated by the French Renault and Panhard derivatives. This year DB had five cars present that comprised a pair of the tiny new central-seat HBR model with Panhard engines and three HDR models using rear-engined Renault power. Panhard itself, now with a full racing department, had 4 works entries built by Monopole who also had their own entry.

Practice
Jaguar was able to get an unofficial practice in May on the full track in an unrelated event and Tony Rolt took the prototype D-type round fully 5 seconds faster than Alberto Ascari's lap record from the previous year in the Indy-engined Ferrari. In the official practice, all three works cars recorded identical times. and they and the Ferraris were a step up from the rest of the field. Overall, the Jaguars had better handling, disc brakes and were faster (Moss was timed at 154.44 mph/278 km/h over the flying kilometre, giving a huge 20 km/h advantage), but the Ferrari had superior power and acceleration. The supercharged Aston Martin, the Lagonda, and the Porsches were also impressively quick.

Unfortunately the Maserati works transporter broke down en route to the track and the car had to be withdrawn as it arrived too late for scrutineering. The Marquis de Portago was able to take the start however, as he had driven his own car direct from the Modena factory in Italy.

Controversially, Gilberte Thirion qualified the 2-litre works Gordini but was excluded from competing because of her gender (only three years after the Coupe des Dames was awarded to female drivers) – her father drove in her stead in the race.

Race

Start
At 4pm the race was started under dark clouds by Prince Bernhard, consort of Queen Juliana of the Netherlands, and an avid motor-racing fan. It came as no surprise when the mighty 375's of González, Marzotto and Manzon stormed away in 1-2-3 formation at the start, with Moss, Rolt and Wharton (who had a startline collision) in close pursuit. After only five laps the first heavy downpour arrived, negating the Ferrari power advantage. By the end of the first hour, González and Marzotto and Moss had a gap over Rolt, and Manzon. The rest of the field was already a lap down. Forty minutes later on lap 22, still in heavy rain, Moss managed to take the lead, starting the to-and–fro battle between the two marques. Wharton had been held up in the first hour with a blocked fuel filter and over the next couple of hours, the other two Jaguars suffered engine misfires giving the Ferraris a lap's lead over the field. Walker stopped out on the track for 50 minutes, but the Moss/Walker car would not be staging an epic comeback this year. Meanwhile, Behra's Gordini and Fitch's Cunningham were regularly trading places in the top-10, mimicking the disc-brakes versus power battle at the front. However soon after 7pm, Behra pitted with ignition problems and then stopped out on the track beyond Mason Blanche. He pushed the car all the way back to the pits to get going again, but it eventually retired in the middle of the night. 

A number of other cars had been caught out in the rain: On only lap 5 Count Baggio planted the playboy Ferrari right into the Tertre Rouge sandbank and could not dig it out (so Rubirosa never got a chance to drive for his movie-star girlfriend). The other American Ferrari, of Fitch/Walters, was running 6th when a rocker-arm broke, dropping them out of the running while the engine was repaired. Eric Thompson spun the Lagonda backwards into the bank at the Esses. After nearly 2hours to get it mobile and back to the pits it was retired because the rear lights were too badly damaged and deemed unsafe.

After four hours, at 8pm, González and Marzotto were lapping together, still having not swapped with their respective co-drivers, and a lap ahead of Rosier and Whitehead. Salvadori was fifth in the supercharged Aston, then Hamilton and the two Aston coupés, the Belgian Jaguar and Cunningham's own car filling out the top ten.

Night
At 9.30pm, the Talbot of Meyrat collided with the Aston Martin of 'Jimmy' Stewart as both were lapping a slower car in the fast section coming up to Maison Blanche. Meyrat ended in the hedgerows, but the Aston Martin rolled throwing Stewart clear. The car was completely written off and Stewart was very lucky to only suffer a serious arm break (that eventually contributed to his retirement from racing). The mid-evening showers caused another flurry of accidents and retirements, including Levegh who was in 8th place when he spun and wrecked his Talbot's suspension.
As the rain finally eased off Wharton and Whitehead made a strong comeback, getting back to 3rd which became 2nd when the Maglioli/Manzon Ferrari broke its gearbox just after 11pm.

The D-types were now steadily hauling themselves back into contention. At midnight González/Trintignant were two laps ahead of Whitehead/Wharton. Manzon/Rosier were third, ahead of Rolt/Hamilton and the Aston Martins of Parnell/Salvadori and Collins/Bira completing the top six. The rain returned and the lead Jaguar had to pit again with fuel-line issues. After several more pitstops it finally retired with a broken gearbox. It joined Moss' car that had become undriveable after he had a total brake failure at the end of the Mulsanne straight doing 160 mph  (taking two miles to stop on the escape road with hand-brake and gearbox!) Rolt and Hamilton however, managed to move into 2nd place by half-time, albeit still two laps adrift. Third was the other Ferrari, followed by the Spear/Johnston Cunningham and the supercharged Aston Martin. Just afterward, in an unusual co-incidence, Prince Bira crashed his Aston Martin, while running in 4th place, within yards of Thompson's Aston coupé that had crashed earlier. In the next hour, the Herrmann/Polensky Porsche, leading the S-1500 class and an impressive 7th place overall, retired with a blown head gasket. This left Macklin leading the class in the OSCA, a full 20 laps ahead of the Bristol leading the S-2000 class

Morning
As dawn arrived the Ferrari of Rosier/Manzon, running third, retired with a broken gearbox, jammed in second gear. Now the battle was reduced to just one car for each team at the front of the field. What's more, as the clouds built up and rain became an ever-present threat, the prospects for the aerodynamic D-types were starting to look promising. 

By breakfast time, the rain started to come down very heavily and the stage was set for a heroic chase. González and Trintignant could afford to take things cautiously, but any unnecessary delays would enable the pursuing Jaguar to open up a chink the Ferrari's armour, and as the rain intensified, the sole remaining D-type piled on the pressure. But Trintignant responded and both cars roared round doing sub-4'30" lap-times. By 9.30am, after González's fuel stop when the Ferrari hesitated in restarting, the Jaguar team got more motivation and the lead was down to 3 minutes.  But at 10am, Rolt glanced the bank coming out of Arnage lapping a slower car, and 2 minutes were lost in the pits for a bout of impromptu panelbeating.

The rain then eased during the morning, allowing the Ferrari to use its power to better effect, but still the Jaguar would not give up. Despite this, the race order remained fairly constant and at midday the order was still Ferrari, Jaguar, Cunningham, Jaguar, Cunningham, Aston Martin, Gordini and the OSCA as the leading small-engined car. The two remaining Porsches were running slowly, trying to get to the end of the race. The supercharged Aston Martin had been running surprisingly well all race until just after midday when a head-gasket failure caused its retirement. Around 1pm a ferocious squall slowed all the cars to a snail's pace, then the Jaguar drivers began to close the gap again on Trintignant as the track dried.

Finish and post-race
With just two hours left to run, González and Trintignant were still almost two laps ahead of the English car. Ninety minutes to run and Trintignant brought the Ferrari in for a routine stop. González took over, but the V12 refused to restart. The Ferrari lost 7 minutes as the mechanics desperately worked on the engine. The rain started again and Rolt was now in sight: he came in to stop for new goggles, but his pit crew waved him on, and now the Jaguar was on the same lap as the leader.

Finally the Ferrari mechanics found the problem: the rain had saturated the ignition wiring.  When González finally got going he was now only 3'14" ahead of the Jaguar. With thunder and lightning now lashing the circuit and unable to see, Rolt pitted and handed over to Hamilton for the final assault with an hour to go. Hamilton then put in extraordinary times in the rain, cutting the lead to just 90 seconds. González was exhausted (he had not eaten or slept through the  weekend) and his lap times dropped to 5'30", but his pit-crew urged him on and as the rain stopped with a half-hour to go, and the track dried out, he was once more able to bring the power of the Ferrari to bear again and extend the gap. Finally able to ease off on the final lap, González crossed the line to win by just under three minutes - but still the closest finish in the race since 1933.

Meanwhile, in the smaller classes, the pair of works OSCAs had an ample lead of 15 laps over the struggling Porsches and running in the top-10 overall. Yet within ten minutes, with just 2 hours to go, everything fell apart. First, the leading one of Giardini crashed and rolled at Mulsanne, then the one running second hit the barriers at Dunlop curve. Pierre Leygonie ran the short distance back to the pits to get equipment and advice from the pit-crew. He managed to get it going again and back to the pits to hand over to Lance Macklin but they were then disqualified at race-end for having abandoned the car. To round off a bitter race for OSCA, their last car was running second in the S-1100 class but its transmission broke in the final laps of the race.

Despite the atrocious weather, González and Trintignant had still driven their Ferrari 375 Plus through 302 laps, just 2 laps less than the year before, and covering over 2,500 miles (4,000 km). In his delight, Prince Bernhard jumped aboard with Trintignant for his victory lap in the rain. In the end it came down to pit-time: 37 minutes for the Jaguar versus 29 minutes for the Ferrari.  The podium was completed by the American pair, William "Bill" Spear and Sherwood Johnston, in their Cunningham C-4R, who were far behind, 19 laps (over 250 km) back, Briggs himself came in 5th. Despite their very reliable Chrysler engines, the Cunninghams were unable to match the pace of the leaders. Splitting the two American cars was the Belgian Jaguar which had run like clockwork despite not getting any pre-race testing. The last remaining Gordini came in 6th earning a special FF1 million prize as first French car home. After the demise of the OSCAs, Porsche inherited class wins in the S-1500, and S-1100, by having the only cars left running in their classes.

Bristol had a great race: finishing 6-7-8 overall and a clear 1-2-3 in their class. Although running most of the race behind the smaller OSCA, their leader finished over 30 laps ahead of the only class-competitor Fraser-Nash to finish. Aside from a window-wiper making life difficult for Wilson/Mayers (they had to drive at times with the door open to see out!) and Jack Fairman spinning with less than an hour to go (thereby losing the class win) they had a trouble-free run.
The little DB cars also had one of their best races – finally winning the Index of Performance, as well as the Biennial Cup. Owner-driver René Bonnet and Élie Bayol finished a remarkable 10th overall with a class-distance record (going further than Nuvolari's winning Alfa Romeo 20 years earlier), embarrassing many far-bigger cars left in their wake. The Monopole entry was second in class, but had the remarkable record of having spent a mere five minutes and ten seconds at rest in the pits for the whole race.

One who did not finish was the last Talbot running – after numerous issues with engine and gearbox problems, the pit crew sent it out with ten minutes to go to do the final lap, but it could not complete it within 30 minutes and so was not classified.

The Argentinian winner earned a special place in Ferrari history: Three years earlier, he had scored Ferrari's first F1 victory. Now, in his last appearance at La Sarthe, he also gave the first victory for the Scuderia Ferrari at Le Mans.
The weather had precluded any chance of breaking distance records, although in the dry both González and Marzotto had smashed Ascari's lap record by over 10 seconds.

Despite its abortive attempt in this race, the 2-litre Maserati proved dominant across Europe, winning over 20 class wins in the season. In October, DB inaugurated the first one-make race series, Formula Monomill for young drivers, using an 851cc DB-Panhard. The first race, at Montlhéry,
was won by Jo Schlesser.

The Porsche 550s had great success in the Championship's final round, in the Carrera Panamericana, with Herrmann finishing an excellent 3rd overall. The year before they had a class win, and the name 'Carrera' was applied to the 356 road-cars with the quad-cam engine. Many sales followed to privateer racers, furthering the company's racing reputation.

Official results
Results taken from Quentin Spurring's book, officially licensed by the ACO

Note *: Not Classified because of Insufficient distance, as car failed to cover 70% of its class-winner's distance
Note **: Not Classified because of failing to complete the final lap of the race in under 30 minutes

Did Not Finish

Index of Performance

Note: Only the top ten positions are included in this set of standings. A score of 1.00 means meeting the minimum distance for the car, and a higher score is exceeding the nominal target distance.

20th Rudge-Whitworth Biennial Cup (1953/1954)

Statistics
Taken from Quentin Spurring's book, officially licensed by the ACO
 Fastest Lap in practice – 	Maglioli, #3 Ferrari 375 Plus & Walker, #12 Jaguar D-Type – 4m 18.0s; 188.23 kp/h (116.96 mph)
 Fastest Lap – González, #4 Ferrari 375 Plus & Marzotto, #3 Ferrari 375 Plus – 4m 16.8s; 189.14 kp/h (117.53 mph)
 Fastest Car in Speedtrap –  Moss, #12 Jaguar D-Type – 278.15 kp/h (172.84 mph)
 Distance – 4061.15 km (2523.56 miles)
 Winner's Average Speed – 169.22 km/h (105.15 mph)
 Attendance –   ?

World Championship Standings after the race

Championship points were awarded for the first six places in each race in the order of 8-6-4-3-2-1. Manufacturers were only awarded points for their highest finishing car, with no points awarded for positions filled by additional cars.

Citations

References
 Spurring, Quentin (2011)    Le Mans 1949-59    Sherborne, Dorset: Evro Publishing  
 Clarke, R.M. - editor (1997)    Le Mans 'The Jaguar Years 1949-1957'    Cobham, Surrey: Brooklands Books  
 Clausager, Anders (1982)    Le Mans    London: Arthur Barker Ltd  
 Henry, Alan (1988)    Fifty Famous Motor Races    Northamptonshire: Patrick Stephen Ltd  
 Laban, Brian (2001)    Le Mans 24 Hours    London: Virgin Books   
 Moity, Christian (1974)    The Le Mans 24 Hour Race 1949-1973    Radnor, Pennsylvania: Chilton Book Co  
 Pomeroy, L. & Walkerley, R. - editors (1954)    The Motor Year Book 1954    Bath: The Pitman Press

External links
 Racing Sports Cars – Le Mans 24 Hours 1954 entries, results, technical detail. Retrieved 20 November 2016.
 Le Mans History – Le Mans History, hour-by-hour (incl. pictures, YouTube links). Retrieved 20 November 2016..
 Formula 2 – Le Mans 1954 results & reserve entries. Retrieved 20 November 2016.

Le Mans
24 Hours of Le Mans races
Le Mans